Nebria cinctella is a species of ground beetle in the Nebriinae subfamily that can be found in India and Nepal.

References

cinctella
Beetles described in 1925
Beetles of Asia